The 2007 Northern Mariana Championship was the second season of top-flight football in Northern Marianas Islands and the first to include a play-off phase. The competition was won by Fiesta Inter Saipan who defeated FC Arirang 3–1 in the final.

Final Table

Results
The season was played in two stages, first a round robin group where all five teams played each other once. the top four teams them progressed to a one-legged semi-final to determine the two teams that would play for the championship.

Group stage

Semifinals

Third place play-off

Final

References

Marianas Soccer League seasons
North
North
football